Petrie Kimbrough (May 1888 – March 11, 1920), better known by his alias Will Lockett, was an American serial killer who killed three women and one girl between 1912 and 1920 in three states, also attempting to kill a woman in his native Kentucky. He was executed for killing 10-year-old Geneva Hardman, whom he killed by crushing her head with a stone.

Biography
Born and reared in Pembroke, Christian County, Kimbrough began using the alias of "Will Lockett" during his travels.

Kimbrough attacked and murdered a white woman at Carmi, Illinois in either 1912 or 1913, near train tracks crossing Louisville and Nashville. In 1917, he choked, raped and beat a black woman at Governor and Canal Streets in Evansville, Indiana, leaving her for dead. He was eventually enlisted to serve in the army at Camp Zachary Taylor in Louisville, Kentucky, where he raped and strangled a woman of "uncertain color" in February 1919. This victim was likely Sallie Anderson Kraft, 55, at Camp Zachary Taylor.

Murder of Geneva Hardman and riots
Geneva Hardman was a 10-year-old white schoolgirl who lived in Lexington, who became Kimbrough's last victim. On February 4, 1920, her school satchel and cap were found near a fence bordering a large cornfield in southern Fayette County by a farmer named Speed Collins. Thinking a student had lost their items, he brought them to the nearby school, where the teacher, Mrs. Anna Young, recognized the items as Hardman's. She sent several older students to check if she was home ill, but her mother alerted them that she had not seen her since the morning.

Collins and local store owner Claude B. Elkin, along with a Thomas Foley, left for the spot where the satchel and cap were found. After taking a closer look, they found the tracks of a large man. Following the trail, they found Geneva's body behind a fodder stock, which had been partly covered. Her body and nearby stalks were covered in blood, with a large rock next to it, and one of her hair ribbons was also found in the mud.

The men then called the sheriff's office and the deputies soon arrived, led by Captain Volney G. Mullikin and his bloodhounds, who followed the large man's tracks leading into the town of Keene, in Jessamine County. It was later determined that although school children and the woman who lived on the road across the field, Bettie McClubbing, had been near the road at the time of the murder, no screams or sounds of a struggle were heard. The authorities' first break came when they met James Woolfolk, who was driving along the south pike and had offered a ride to Will Lockett. Lockett was a former WWI veteran and known burglar and bootlegger, who supported himself as a day laborer on farms.

Continuing to follow the trails into Nicholasville, police questioned a farmer, Will Hughes, who had seen a black man walking along the pike, covered in mud to his knees. By then, a large search party had formed, which even sighted the fleeing man and gave chase, but he fled. He was eventually captured by Dr. W. T. Collette and Deputy Sheriff W. C. White near Dixontown, after he had tried to fool them that he was a man called "Will Hamilton". They initially left him on the road, but they saw him enter a residence and turned around to investigate. "Hamilton" was interrogated by Assistant Chief Ernest Thompson and Det. Dudley Veal, to whom he confessed to attacking Geneva because he had wanted to rape her, but had to kill her with a nearby found rock.

Shortly after, he was sent to the Kentucky State Penitentiary. On February 9, 1920, riots erupted in Lexington, with lynch mobs trying to kill Kimbrough, but they were prevented by National Guard troops who ultimately fired into the crowd; six men were killed and twenty wounded. A soldier and two policemen were also seriously wounded. Amid looting and fears of further violence Governor Edwin Morrow requested Federal help, and 1,200 Army soldiers led by Brigadier General Francis C. Marshall were brought to Lexington on special trains. They were armed with tanks and machine guns. Marshall declared the county to be under martial law. Kimbrough was safely escorted to the prison and after two weeks martial law was lifted.

Trial, sentence and death
After confessing to Warden Chilton his true identity and previous crimes, Kimbrough was taken to court, where he pleaded guilty. During his sentencing hearing, Lockett said "I know I do not deserve mercy, but I am sorry I committed the crime and I would give anything if the little girl could be brought back to life." His lawyer pointed to his honorable discharge, which stated that his character was "very good". The jury fixed Lockett's sentence at death, and he was formally sentenced to death by Judge Charles Kerr for murdering Hardman. Authorities at first attempted to confirm the slayings, but soon lost interest as Kimbrough was going to be executed anyway.

He refused to make a statement when he was taken back to his cell, but prison officials claimed that he had prayed loudly and had sung hymns during the night. Kimbrough publicly stated that he was ready to die, and that he had prayed for both Geneva Hardman and her entire family.

On March 11, 1920, the day of his execution, Kimbrough barely showed any emotion as the black cap was lowered on his face. Shortly thereafter, Collier, the prison executioner, turned on the electric current, which killed the prisoner within 15 seconds without a hitch. The execution was witnessed by Hardman's two brothers and 17 other civilians of Lexington, along with eight soldiers and 12 prison guards. Kimbrough's body was later buried in the prison cemetery.

See also
 List of serial killers in the United States

References

 - Total pages: 128

Bibliography
 Michael Newton: The Encyclopedia of Serial Killers, 2000
 John D. Wright, Jr.: Lexington's Suppression of the 1920 Will Lockett Lynch Mob, 1986, Vol. 84, No. 3

External links
 Article about the Hardman murder from Lexington History Museum

1888 births
1920 deaths
20th-century African-American people
20th-century executions by Kentucky
20th-century executions of American people
American male criminals
American murderers of children
Executed African-American people
Executed American serial killers
Male serial killers
People convicted of murder by Kentucky
People executed by Kentucky by electric chair
People from Christian County, Kentucky
Anti-black racism in the United States
Violence against women in the United States